Each "article" in this category is in fact a collection of entries about several stamp issuers, presented in alphabetical order. The entries themselves are formulated on the micro model and so provide summary information about all known issuers.

See the :Category:Compendium of postage stamp issuers page for details of the project.

Brunei 

Dates 	1895 –
Capital 	Bandar Seri Begawan
Currency 	100 cents = 1 dollar

Main Article
Postage stamps and postal history of Brunei

Brunei (Japanese Occupation) 

Dates 	1942 – 1945
Currency 	100 cents = 1 dollar

Refer 	Japanese Occupation Issues

Brunswick 

Brunswick joined the North German Confederation in 1868.

Dates 	1852 – 1868
Capital 	Brunswick
Currency 	30 silbergroschen = 1 thaler

Refer 	German States

Buenos Aires 

Dates 	1858 – 1862
Currency 	8 reales = 1 peso

Refer 	Argentine Territories

Bukovina 

Refer 	West Ukraine

Bulgaria 

Dates 	1879 –
Capital 	Sofia
Currency 	(1879) 100 centimes = 1 franc
		(1881) 100 stotinki = 1 lev

Main Article
Postage stamps and postal history of Bulgaria

Bulgarian Occupation Issues 

Refer 	Dobruja (Bulgarian Occupation)

Bulgarian Territories 

Main Article Needed

Includes 	Dobruja (Bulgarian Occupation);
		Eastern Rumelia;
		South Bulgaria

Bundi 

Indian state which became part of Rajasthan 1948–50.

Dates 	1894 – 1948
Currency 	12 pies = 1 anna; 16 annas = 1 rupee

Refer 	Indian Native States

Burkina Faso 

Formerly Upper Volta.

Dates 	1984 –
Capital 	Ouagadougou
Currency 	100 centimes = 1 franc

Main Article
Postage stamps and postal history of Burkina Faso

See also 	Upper Volta

Burma 

Dates 	1937 –
Capital 	Rangoon
Currency 	(1937) 12 pies = 1 anna; 16 annas = 1 rupee
		(1953) 100 pyas = 1 kyat (rupee)

Main Article
Postage stamps and postal history of Burma

Includes 	Myanmar

Burma (Japanese Occupation) 

Dates 	1942 – 1945
Currency 	(1942) 12 pies = 1 anna; 16 annas = 1 rupee
		(1942) 100 cents = 1 rupee

Refer 	Japanese Occupation Issues

Burundi 

Dates 	1962 –
Capital 	Bujumbura
Currency 	100 centimes = 1 franc

Main Article
Postage stamps and postal history of Burundi

Bushire (British Occupation) 

Bushire (now Bushehr) is an Iranian port on the Persian Gulf.  During World War I, it was occupied by British forces who issued separate stamps 15 August to 16 October 1915.  There were 30 stamps in three issues.  All were Iranian types overprinted BUSHIRE UNDER BRITISH OCCUPATION.

Dates 	1915 only
Currency 	20 shahis = 1 kran; 10 kran = 1 toman

Refer 	British Occupation Issues

Bussahir 

Dates 	1895 – 1901
Currency 	16 annas = 1 rupee

Refer 	Indian Native States

Byelorussia 

Refer 	Belarus

References

Bibliography
 Stanley Gibbons Ltd, Europe and Colonies 1970, Stanley Gibbons Ltd, 1969
 Stanley Gibbons Ltd, various catalogues
 Stuart Rossiter & John Flower, The Stamp Atlas, W H Smith, 1989
 XLCR Stamp Finder and Collector's Dictionary, Thomas Cliffe Ltd, c.1960

External links
 AskPhil – Glossary of Stamp Collecting Terms
 Encyclopaedia of Postal History

Brunei